The Mid Devon Show is an agricultural show held annually in July in Tiverton, Devon, England. It is organised by the Mid Devon Town and Country Society and includes farm demonstrations, arts and rural crafts.

History
The 2014 and the 21st show was the last show to be held at the original site of Hartnoll Farm, Post Hill, Tiverton.

The 2015 and 22nd show was held at a new site at Knightshayes Court, Tiverton.

References

External links

Tiverton, Devon
Events in Devon
Agricultural shows in England
1994 establishments in England
Festivals established in 1994